Smith's Fort Plantation is a house and parcel of land located in Surry County, Virginia, United States.  The current main house on the property, also known as the Faulcon House, dates from 1751.  The house has been an example for numerous twentieth century reproductions.  It is also known as Warren House and Rolfe-Warren House.

History
The plantation received its name because it was the location of Captain John Smith's "New Fort," built in 1609, located directly across the James River from the Jamestown colony.  The fort was quickly abandoned due to dry rot and a rat infestation.  The same land was later given by Chief Powhatan to John Rolfe as a dowry for the hand of Pocahontas when Rolfe and Pocahontas married.  Archaeological surveys of the property have revealed that a number of structures have existed on the property and the present, restored main house was built by Jacob Faulcon in 1751.

Preservation
The property and current house was acquired by Preservation Virginia (formerly known as the Association for the Preservation of Virginia Antiquities) in 1933 after undergoing restoration funded by John D. Rockefeller, Jr.  It is currently open as a museum with furnishings from the late 16th through the early 18th centuries.  The property serves as a host to the annual Old Virginia Christmas-Festival of Crafts.

Archaeological investigations
The Association for the Preservation of Virginia Antiquites maintains the site now, whose location matches Smith's description. Hume suggests that it makes sense that Smith's description of the fort as a "retreat," makes this site a likely spot for trading parties to seek refuge.

Archaeological investigations over the site have been limited to the excavations of a ditch and a highly eroded rampart.  Further archaeological work to determine if this site was indeed the site of Smith's fort would be necessary.  Hume notes that this site does seem to be the site of Smith's fort because the construction type is very similar in nature to the types of earthworks built on Ronoake Island.

References

External links
Smith's Fort Plantation website
Old Virginia Christmas
Rolfe House, Surry County Courthouse vicinity, Surry, Surry County, VA: 8 photos and 2 data pages at Historic American Buildings Survey

Historic American Buildings Survey in Virginia
James River plantations
Museums in Surry County, Virginia
Historic house museums in Virginia
Georgian architecture in Virginia
Houses on the National Register of Historic Places in Virginia
Archaeological sites on the National Register of Historic Places in Virginia
Houses completed in 1751
Houses in Surry County, Virginia
National Register of Historic Places in Surry County, Virginia
Plantation houses in Virginia
1751 establishments in Virginia